Seán Dermot Fintan O'Leary Jr. (born 24 May 1973) is an English broadcaster who currently works for ITV and BBC Radio 2. His radio career began when he worked as a disc jockey at Essex Radio, but he is best known for being the presenter of The X Factor (UK) on ITV, a position he held from 2007 until its final series in 2018, with the exception of 2015. Since 2021, O'Leary has presented ITV's This Morning on a Friday, School and Bank Holidays alongside Alison Hammond.

Early life
Seán Dermot Fintan O'Leary Jr. was born on 24 May 1973 in Colchester, Essex, the son of Irish parents Maria and Seán; he holds both British and Irish citizenship. He attended primary school in nearby Marks Tey and later joined St Benedict's Catholic College in Colchester. His relaxed attitude at school caused him to fail all but two of his GCSEs. Following that, O'Leary re-took his school-leaving qualifications. This allowed him to later start his A-Level courses at Colchester Sixth Form College. He eventually studied for a degree in Media Studies with Politics at Middlesex University. Growing up, he was a member of The Boys' Brigade Christian youth organisation. When he was in his late teens, he played American football for the Colchester Gladiators and the Ipswich Cardinals, where he wore the number 32.

Career

Early career
O'Leary started as a disc jockey at BBC Essex, based in Southend-on-Sea, before becoming a runner on the TV show Light Lunch with Mel Giedroyc and Sue Perkins and then a presenter at Channel 4 as part of the original presenting line-up of the channel's T4 strand, before moving on to present Big Brother's Little Brother (the companion show to Big Brother) on E4 from 2001 onwards. Also in 2001, O'Leary appeared on Lily Savage's Blankety Blank. In 2004, Dermot hosted the TV show Shattered.

ITV
On 29 March 2007, it was announced that O'Leary would replace Kate Thornton as the new host of ITV's The X Factor for at least two series. On 27 March 2015, O'Leary confirmed that he had quit The X Factor after eight years to pursue other projects. Via his Twitter account, he said:

O'Leary was replaced by Olly Murs and Caroline Flack, who previously co-hosted The Xtra Factor, the behind-the-scenes companion programme, together in 2011 and 2012.

On 29 March 2016, O'Leary returned to The X Factor as a presenter, replacing Murs and Flack, for the show's 13th series. In a statement, he said: 

From 2010 to 2019, O'Leary presented the National Television Awards for ITV. Since 2010, O'Leary has hosted Soccer Aid on ITV, a celebrity football match in aid of the charity Unicef. In 2011, O'Leary hosted the Saturday night entertainment show The Marriage Ref on ITV. In September 2013, O'Leary hosted BRITs Icon: Elton John, a one-off music celebration for ITV.

In 2013, O'Leary presented the ITV campaign From the Heart, which encouraged viewers to consider organ donation. In January 2014, O'Leary filled in for Phillip Schofield for a week when he guest presented This Morning opposite Holly Willoughby.

In 2017, O'Leary co-presented the 37th BRIT Awards with Emma Willis. In March 2017, O'Leary guest-presented nine episodes of The Nightly Show on ITV.

In November 2020, it was announced that Eamonn Holmes and Ruth Langsford had been dropped from their Friday slot on This Morning after 14 years. Alison Hammond and O'Leary were announced to takeover the slot later that month. They presented their first show in January 2021.

Channel 4
On 27 November 2007, it was announced that Big Brother: Celebrity Hijack was to be O'Leary's last series of Big Brother, and that he would not return in summer 2008. After seven years, he made his final Big Brother appearance on 28 January 2008.

In March 2007, O'Leary signed a year-long contract with Channel 4 to appear on Hollyoaks. However, this was shortened after a series of disputes on set. Jim Rowe, a series writer at the time, said, "He couldn't follow even the simplest commands. It goes to show how vastly different presenting is to acting". O'Leary hasn't acted since. In 2009, O'Leary presented an episode of The Paul O'Grady Show, standing in for Paul O'Grady.

In March 2014, O'Leary made a return to Channel 4, where he presented the Live From Space season for three consecutive nights.

BBC
O'Leary was a presenter for Comic Relief in 2005, 2011 and 2013. He also presented Sport Relief in 2012. In August 2006, O'Leary signed a deal to present the game show 1 vs. 100, which aired on Saturday nights on BBC One in combination with The National Lottery Draws.

In May 2009, O'Leary became the presenter of Matt Lucas and David Walliams's show Rock Profile on BBC.

In March 2010, O'Leary hosted a spin-off edition of the BBC One show Question Time aimed at first time voters, which aired on BBC Three. He also presented Dermot Meets..., a series which saw him interview the likes of David Cameron, Gordon Brown, and Nick Clegg.

In November 2015, O'Leary replaced Terry Wogan on Children in Need due to Wogan's cancer-related ill health, from which he died a couple of months later.

In 2016, O'Leary presented the BBC One Saturday night game show The Getaway Car. The series was filmed in November 2015 and began airing in January 2016. He has also guest-presented two episodes of The One Show with Alex Jones.

Radio
O'Leary joined London's indie rock station XFM in 2001, firstly presenting weekday mid-mornings from 10am to 1pm, before moving to a Saturday evening show in mid-2002, where he remained until late 2003.

O'Leary joined BBC Radio 2 in September 2004, presenting a Saturday afternoon show titled Dermot's Saturday Club, which ran from 2pm to 4pm. Following a number of changes to the length and timing of O'Leary's programme, due in part to the arrival of Chris Evans to Radio 2 and his role as presenter of The X Factor, his show was broadcast between 3pm and 6pm from April 2009 until its end on 21 January 2017. It focused on new music and had featured live sessions from the likes of Oasis, Supergrass, the Raconteurs, Massive Attack, Kasabian, the Guillemots, Beck, Lily Allen, Foo Fighters, Bloc Party, and Kate Nash. O'Leary also hosted Radio 2's coverage of the BRIT Awards and South by Southwest. He won Sony Gold Awards for Music Programme of the Year in 2008, 2010, and 2013.

Since March 2017, O'Leary has presented the Saturday morning breakfast show on BBC Radio 2 between 8am and 10am, taking over the slot from Brian Matthew and Sounds of the 60s, which moved to an earlier time of 6am with Tony Blackburn as presenter.

O'Leary sits in for Zoe Ball's Radio 2 breakfast show when she's off for a holiday or on a break.

Other work
In March 2009, O'Leary introduced Michael Jackson to an audience of fans at The O2 in what turned out to be Jackson's final public appearance before his death.

In 2015, he was named one of GQ's 50 Best Dressed Men in Britain.

He has voiced television advertisements for Amazon Prime. In 2017, he released a children's book called Toto the Ninja Cat and the Great Snake Escape.

Charity work
O'Leary opened The Rodillian Academy in 2001. He is one of nine presidents of the Young People's Trust for the Environment and is a patron of the international children's film festival CineMagic, a registered charity for young people based in Belfast. He has campaigned on behalf of Make Poverty History, and visited Sierra Leone with CAFOD accompanied by his father. He is also a patron of the male cancer awareness campaign Everyman. In 2003, he played in a charity match for the Colchester Gladiators as a punt returner, helping to raise £2,500 for the Barnardo's children's fund.

In 2005, O'Leary ran the London Marathon for the third time, completing it for his first time under four hours.

In March 2014, along with Jeremy Kyle, Bill Bailey, John Prescott, Richard Osman, Rizzle Kicks, Louis Smith, Levi Roots, and Ricky Wilson, O'Leary went commando for charity to raise awareness of testicular cancer. The promo was released on 24 February 2014.

For Red Nose Day 2015, O'Leary participated in a 24-hour dance to raise money for Comic Relief.

Personal life
O'Leary married his long-term girlfriend, Dee Koppang, in Chiddingstone in September 2012. They have one son, who was born in June 2020.

In a 2003 interview, O'Leary identified as a fan of the Socialist Workers Party but added that they would "take all of [his] money", so he instead supported the Labour Party. He supports Arsenal F.C. and London Irish RFC. He can be heard on the Footballistically Arsenal podcast with his friends and fellow Arsenal fans Dan Baldwin and Boyd Hilton; on the show, it was mentioned that he owns shares in the club. He supports Wexford GAA in Gaelic games. During a studio guest appearance on Fantasy Football Euro 2004, he spoke of his support for the Republic of Ireland national football team and the national rugby union team.

In 2007, O'Leary was an usher at the wedding of Holly Willoughby. He is a practising Roman Catholic. In an interview with Peter Stanford of the Daily Telegraph in February 2008, he "cheerfully" admitted using contraception while living with his future wife: "I do get it in the neck from some Catholics who say I am a buffet Catholic, picking and choosing the bits I like or don't like."

O'Leary co-owned the Fishy Fishy restaurants in Brighton and Poole. The Poole restaurant closed in 2013, and the Brighton restaurant closed in 2016.

Television

Radio

References

External links

 
 Dermot O'Leary (BBC Radio 2)
 Alternative Sounds of the 90s with Dermot O'Leary (BBC Radio 2)

1973 births
Living people
Alumni of Middlesex University
BBC Radio 2 presenters
English people of Irish descent
English radio DJs
English Roman Catholics
English socialists
English television presenters
Labour Party (UK) people
People from Colchester
Television personalities from Essex